The Belgium women's national rugby sevens team are a national sporting side of Belgium, representing them at Rugby sevens.

Tournament History

They won the 2013 FIRA-AER Women's Sevens – Division A and were promoted to the Grand Prix Series. In the 2014 Rugby Europe Women's Sevens Grand Prix Series they placed 10th in both tournaments in Moscow and Brive and finally eleventh overall. They were relegated to the Trophy division for 2015, they became champions once again and were promoted to the Grand Prix Series for 2016.

Belgium placed 6th overall in the 2016 Grand Prix Series and qualified for a spot at the 2017 Hong Kong Women's Sevens, which acted as a qualifier for the 2017–18 World Rugby Women's Sevens Series. Had they won, they would have earned "core team" status.

Players

Previous squads

References

External links
 Belgian Rugby Federation - Official Site

European national women's rugby union teams
R
Women's national rugby sevens teams